Júlio Kuntz (3 September 1897 – 19 August 1938) was a Brazilian footballer. He played in ten matches for the Brazil national football team from 1920 to 1922. He was also part of Brazil's squad for the 1920 South American Championship.

References

External links
 

1897 births
1938 deaths
Brazilian footballers
Brazil international footballers
Place of birth missing
Association football goalkeepers
Grêmio Foot-Ball Porto Alegrense players
CR Flamengo footballers